Dominion was a national chain of supermarkets in Canada, which was known as the Dominion of Canada when the chain was founded. The chain was founded in 1919 in Ontario and was later acquired by the Argus Corporation. It was later sold to The Great Atlantic & Pacific Tea Company (A&P), which restricted the chain to the Greater Toronto Area. Stores outside Ontario were converted to the A&P banner or sold to third parties. A&P's Canadian division was later acquired by Metro Inc., which rebranded the remaining Dominion stores to its namesake banner in 2008.

History
Dominion started from one Toronto store on May 23, 1919. The store was founded by American businessmen Robert Jackson of New Hampshire and William J. Pentland of Connecticut. Pentland was manager of A&P stores in Connecticut and was hired by Jackson. By the end of 1919, they had a 20-store chain of which 18 were acquired from rival Loblaws. A year later, they had 61 stores. In 1929, Dominion tried to acquire a stake in Loblaws, but the stock market crash ended the growth. During the Depression, Dominion lost both founders: Jackson went bankrupt and Pentland was killed in an auto accident in 1933.

Dominion's leadership was not resolved until 1939, when J. William Horsey became president. He in turn sold Dominion Stores to Argus Corporation. Smaller stores were consolidated from 574 to 195 by 1954. In the 1950s, Dominion began to build large stores with airy ceilings and large glass fronts. The chain also expanded beyond Toronto to other parts of Ontario, Quebec, Alberta, Manitoba, Saskatchewan and Atlantic Canada.

In 1978, Conrad Black took control of the Argus Corporation. Moving the Dominion holdings into the Hollinger Inc. portion of Argus, Dominion was stripped of cash from the daily flow. Dominion Stores were acquired by A&P's Canadian division, A&P Canada, from Hollinger in 1985, the final year of Black's sell off of virtually all previous holdings of Argus Corporation. Some Dominion locations, rebranded "Mr. Grocer" in an attempt to break union contracts and convert company-owned stores to franchise locations, were not part of the A&P transaction. These were sold to National Grocers, which phased out the "Mr. Grocer" brand and signage.

In the 1990s, A&P rebranded all of its stores in the Greater Toronto Area as Dominion stores, absorbing Miracle Food Mart, while Dominion locations elsewhere in Ontario took the A&P or Food Basics name.

The territory of Dominion stores was approximately the following: Toronto; York Region, excluding Stouffville; Mississauga and Oakville; and Pickering and Ajax.

In northwestern Ontario, Safeway acquired at least two stores in Thunder Bay. (Safeway's presence in Thunder Bay prevents Metro from offering Air Miles at its Thunder Bay locations.)

In Western Canada, Dominion stores were closed, leaving many suburban shopping malls scrambling to fill large, now-vacant sections. This event, coupled with the subsequent collapse of several department store chains, sparked a wave of mall renovations in many parts of the country. Alberta stores were acquired by Safeway in the late 1960s.

The remainder of the chain in eastern Canada was acquired by Loblaw Companies, through several unrelated transactions:

 Newfoundland: Dominion stores in Newfoundland were sold to local owners, who then resold them to Loblaw in 1995. The Newfoundland locations are the only ones to continue under the Dominion banner; see Dominion Stores (Newfoundland).
 New Brunswick: Shortly after the A&P acquisition, these stores were sold to Food Group Inc., which operated them under the Village banner until Food Group was sold to Loblaw and merged into its Atlantic Superstore unit in 1995.
 Nova Scotia: These locations were sold to Oshawa Group and became IGA stores. However, after Sobeys purchased Oshawa in 1999, Loblaw took over IGA's Atlantic Canada locations.
 Quebec: Dominion stores in Quebec were sold to Provigo in 1981; Provigo was acquired by Loblaws in 1998.

Battle over pension surplus 1985
In 1985, Dominion withdrew $37.9 million from its defined benefit pension plan for Canadian employees.  The amount represented an actuarial surplus in the plan, and Dominion had approval from the provincial regulator, the Pension Commission of Ontario (a predecessor entity to the Financial Services Regulatory Authority of Ontario) to make the withdrawal.  However, the right to make that withdrawal was challenged by the union representing the employees, the Retail, Wholesale and Department Store Union.  In September 1986, Justice Robert Reid of the Ontario Supreme Court of Justice order Dominion to return the money to the plan, stating in his judgment that Dominion "had no right, under the plan documents, to remove the surplus". Dominion eventually reached a settlement with the union to withdraw a portion of the surplus.

Demise
 Metro, which had operated solely in Quebec and the Ottawa area, acquired A&P Canada from the U.S.-based parent company effective August 15, 2005. A&P retained a minority ownership share of the combined company for a time.

On August 7, 2008, Metro announced it would invest $200 million consolidating the company's conventional food stores under the Metro banner. Over a period of 15 months, all stores were converted to the Metro name, beginning with the Dominion stores in the Toronto area.

Dominion's distribution centres in Toronto and Mississauga retained the old Dominion banner until 2009.

Key people
 J. William Pentland — co-founder
 Robert Jackson — co-founder
 J. William Horsey — President
 John A. McDougald — financier and controlling interest in 1940s to 1970s
 E. P. Taylor
 Conrad Black

See also
List of supermarket chains in Canada

Notes

References
 Dominion Stores: The First Sixty Years 1919–1979, Paul Nanton, Toronto: Clarke, Irwin & Company, 1979
 Dominion: Sixty Years of Dependability, Ted Wood, Toronto: Dominion Stores, 1979

External links
Metro Canada

1919 establishments in Ontario
2008 disestablishments in Ontario
Retail companies established in 1919
Defunct companies of Ontario
Defunct supermarkets of Canada
Metro Inc.
Retail companies disestablished in 2008
The Great Atlantic & Pacific Tea Company
Companies based in Toronto